Pinghe County is a county of the prefecture-level city of Zhangzhou, in southern Fujian province, PRC, bordering Guangdong province to the west.

Administrative Division
The administrative centre or seat of Pinghe County is Xiaoxi.

Towns (镇, zhen)
Most of Pinghe's old People's communes, after spending the 80s and even 90s as Townships, have been upgraded to Towns. Aside of Xiaoxi, there are now nine:
Wenfeng
Shange (山格
Nansheng
Banzai (坂仔)
Anhou
Daxi
Jiufeng
Xiazhai
Luxi
Guoqiang

Townships (乡, xiang)
There are five townships.

Economy

Pinghe County is famous for its pomelos.

Tulou

Numerous Fujian Tulou, earth buildings of round, rectangular and other shapes, can be found within Pinghe County, primarily in its western part (viz., various villages of Luxi, Xiazhai, Jiufeng and Daxi Towns). One of them, the Xishuang Lou, located in Xi'an Village a few kilometers north of Xiazhai town center, has been described by some researchers as the "largest of the rectangular [tulou] in existence". Unfortunately, only parts of the compound have survived to this day.

Climate

References

External links 

  

County-level divisions of Fujian
Zhangzhou